Promenetus is a genus of gastropods belonging to the family Planorbidae.

The species of this genus are found in Northern America.

Species:

Promenetus exacuous 
Promenetus umbilicatellus

References

Planorbidae